Walnut Grove is a census-designated place (CDP) in Sacramento County, California, United States. It is part of the Sacramento–Arden-Arcade–Roseville Metropolitan Statistical Area. The population was 1,542 at the 2010 census, up from 669 at the 2000 census.

Geography
Walnut Grove is located at  (38.243490, −121.512100).

Demographics

2010
The 2010 United States Census reported that Walnut Grove had a population of 1,542. The racial makeup of Walnut Grove was 943 (61.2%) White, 15 (1.0%) African American, 24 (1.6%) Native American, 110 (7.1%) Asian, 0 (0.0%) Pacific Islander, 402 (26.1%) from other races, and 48 (3.1%) from two or more races. Hispanic or Latino of any race were 673 persons (43.6%).

The Census reported that 1,533 people (99.4% of the population) lived in households, 9 (0.6%) lived in non-institutionalized group quarters, and 0 (0%) were institutionalized.

There were 585 households, out of which 182 (31.1%) had children under the age of 18 living in them, 293 (50.1%) were opposite-sex married couples living together, 56 (9.6%) had a female householder with no husband present, 41 (7.0%) had a male householder with no wife present.  There were 35 (6.0%) unmarried opposite-sex partnerships, and 4 (0.7%) same-sex married couples or partnerships. 165 households (28.2%) were made up of individuals, and 66 (11.3%) had someone living alone who was 65 years of age or older. The average household size was 2.62.  There were 390 families (66.7% of all households); the average family size was 3.23.

The population was spread out, with 357 people (23.2%) under the age of 18, 137 people (8.9%) aged 18 to 24, 376 people (24.4%) aged 25 to 44, 432 people (28.0%) aged 45 to 64, and 240 people (15.6%) who were 65 years of age or older.  The median age was 40.6 years. For every 100 females, there were 112.1 males.  For every 100 females age 18 and over, there were 113.9 males.

The homeowner vacancy rate was 1.6%; the rental vacancy rate was 6.7%.  701 people (45.5% of the population) lived in owner-occupied housing units and 832 people (54.0%) lived in rental housing units.

2000
As of the census of 2000, there were 669 people, 245 households, and 159 families residing in the CDP. The racial makeup of the CDP was 49.78% White, 1.49% African American, 3.14% Native American, 21.23% Asian, 0.15% Pacific Islander, 19.13% from other races, and 5.08% from two or more races. Hispanic or Latino of any race were 46.79% of the population.

There were 245 households, out of which 31.0% had children under the age of 18 living with them, 43.3% were married couples living together, 15.5% had a female householder with no husband present, and 35.1% were non-families. 31.0% of all households were made up of individuals, and 14.3% had someone living alone who was 65 years of age or older.  The average household size was 2.73 and the average family size was 3.46.

In the CDP, the population was spread out, with 25.3% under the age of 18, 11.4% from 18 to 24, 28.1% from 25 to 44, 18.4% from 45 to 64, and 16.9% who were 65 years of age or older.  The median age was 35 years. For every 100 females, there were 95.0 males.  For every 100 females age 18 and over, there were 96.9 males.

The median income for a household in the CDP was $40,179, and the median income for a family was $39,667. Males had a median income of $41,563 versus $23,417 for females. The per capita income for the CDP was $14,939.  About 14.0% of families and 11.3% of the population were below the poverty line, including 12.9% of those under age 18 and 3.0% of those age 65 or over.

History
Established in 1850 by John W. Sharp, Walnut Grove is one of the earliest settlements along the Sacramento River. Sharp journeyed west from Ohio with his young family and chose the site of Walnut Grove because of the abundant walnut and oak forests in the area.   The town quickly prospered as an agricultural center and riverboat stop (the forests were timbered for steamboat firewood). It was also a major shipping port by 1865 for agricultural produce and fish, with the Bartlett pear as its primary product. By 1870, it had become a thriving town full of small businesses (many owned by the Sharp family), a school, post office, and Union Guard Armory.

After Sharp's death in 1880, the heirs sold a large portion of the estate to Agnes Brown and her son Alex.  The Brown family subsequently became heavily involved in the commercial life of the community, operating a general store, hotel, and asparagus packing house, as well as the Bank of Alex Brown.   Due to the demands for rich agricultural land over time, although the town has remained compact in size, it holds the distinction of being the only river town along the Sacramento River to occupy both the east and west riverbanks.

Ferry service operated for many years between parts of town on either side of the river until the first bridge was opened in 1916.  The bridge, since replaced by a modern span, was the first cantilevered counterweight bascule drawbridge constructed west of the Mississippi River.  It was officially opened by the Governor of California, who traveled with various dignitaries to Walnut Grove on the gubernatorial yacht.

As early as 1914, a large Japanese community lived in Walnut Grove. The Nichi-Bei Nenkan (Japanese American Yearbook) of 1914 includes a directory of 67 Japanese-owned businesses, including one tofu shop: Sakai Tofu-ya. There was still a tofu shop in town in 1975, according to The Book of Tofu.

The community was racially segregated up to the start of World War II.  Only whites were allowed to own homes on the west side of the river.  Even on the east side, the Asians separated into a Japanese section and a Chinese section. There were two elementary schools [a "white" school and Walnut Grove Oriental Elementary] until the Japanese were forcibly moved out of the area at the start of World War II. Then, the two elementary schools [up to Grade 8] were combined. After elementary school, the students were bused to Courtland for high school, until that school became identified as an earthquake hazard.

The Chinese residents immigrated from two different areas in the Delta region in Guangdong, China; immigrants from Zhongshan resided in Locke, while those from Taishan populated Walnut Grove. During the Sino-Japanese War in the 1930s, the Walnut Grove-Locke-Isleton area was a prime target for visiting Chinese government VIPs to raise funds for the Chinese government.

The principal activities in the Walnut Grove Chinese community were operating illegal gambling houses and Chinese restaurants. These services were primarily for migrant farm workers from the Philippines. "Whites" were not allowed to enter for fear they might be police authorities. Routine police raids were staged during election times to demonstrate the Sacramento County Sheriff's "fight against crime".

In the early 1930s, Walnut Grove was a thriving community until fire again consumed the Chinese section in the mid-1930s. In its glory days of the 1930s and early 1940s, a daily shuttle operated by the Ow family carried Chinese to and from San Francisco; it also accepted and executed orders for merchandise from San Francisco.  The route started from Courtland with stops at Locke, Walnut Grove, and Isleton and returned nightly.

After World War II, gambling operations ceased. Members from the small Chinese community in Walnut Grove moved to the cities and many elder Filipinos returned to their homeland.

Sugar beet harvesting was active up to the late 1940s.  There were two leading areas where beets were unloaded from trucks into a hopper, then conveyed up a belt to fill Southern Pacific railroad cars for the trip north to Sacramento for processing. Asian women worked in fruit packing houses throughout the Delta area [Locke, Walnut Grove, Ryde, Isleton] while men worked in the fields.

In 1961, documentary photographer Pirkle Jones did a photo essay on Walnut Grove.

Sites of interest

Towers
Walnut Grove's location has made it the site of a rare collection of very tall radio and television transmission towers.  The first major tower here was the KXTV/KOVR/KCRA Tower built in 1962, which dominated the skyline for over twenty years with its 1,548 foot height.  In 1985 the old tower was joined by taller structures.  The guyed KXTV/KOVR Tower is, with a height of 2,048 feet, one of the tallest constructions in the world. Two other guyed towers of similar height are the 1,996 foot high Channel 40 Tower, KTXL, and the 2,000 foot high Hearst-Argyle Tower.  Towers sited here at the natural corner of the California Central Valley have line of sight coverage of flat valley floor for over 60 miles(100 kilometers) to the north and to the south-southeast, and quite good coverage into the Sierra foothills and mountains across the valley to the northeast and east. However, these towers and their guy-wires are a significant hazard to aircraft, which can otherwise freely cross most of the Central Valley at 656 feet of altitude.

Delta Meadows State Recreation Area

Located along the Railroad Slough Levee, and accessed from the River Road between Walnut Grove and Locke, via a small gravel road just north-east of the Delta Cross Channel, a water diversion facility on the Sacramento River. Additionally, a docent program through Delta Natural History Association provides canoes with guides in the spring and fall, reserved through Brannan Island State Park.

Locke
Chan Tin-San is commonly credited as the earliest resident of Locke, California. He was the first Chinese person to construct a building on the Locke brothers' property, where he realized the business potential of the Southern Pacific wharf and warehouse. After the October 1916 fire which destroyed the Walnut Grove Chinatown, a number of Chung-San District people moved to the area and Locke was officially established. Lee Bing, the leader of the group, financed nine of the buildings. Locke is one of the only towns in the United States built entirely by Chinese. It was built in 1915 and burned down twice. Locke was a bustling place with gambling houses, merchant stores and a movie house all owned by the Chinese. Locke today is much like it was many years ago. Most of the original buildings are still standing. The Southern Pacific wharf and warehouse was built in three stages, the first in 1906. During the harvest season a half dozen or more fruit packers would rent space in the warehouse, among them were Scobel & Day, Simons & French, Earl Fruit Company, and the California Packing Corporation. The rail spur served the warehouse and connected with the Walnut Grove Branch line. The warehouse operated two freight elevators which raised produce from the decks of the riverboats. The warehouse is now used to store and launch pleasure boats.

Notable people
 Bo Eason – former safety for University of California, Davis and the Houston Oilers, actor, playwright.
 Tony Eason – former quarterback for the University of Illinois and the New England Patriots.
 John Garamendi – Representative in U.S. Congress for California's 3rd congressional district, former lieutenant governor, former insurance commissioner.
 Mike Honda – Former US Representative and former member of the California state assembly.

Government

In popular culture
In Sons of Anarchy, season 4/episode 10, "Hands", Jax Teller and Tara Knowles' family outing at Walnut Grove Park with their sons is cut short, and Tara's plan to attend a surgical conference in Providence, Oregon, at a hospital she plans to transfer to, is foiled when hit men hired by Clay Morrow abduct Tara from the park and severely wound her.

References

External links
 “Locke and Walnut Grove: Havens for Early Asian Immigrants in California”, a National Park Service Teaching with Historic Places (TwHP) lesson plan

Census-designated places in Sacramento County, California
Census-designated places in California
Populated places on the Sacramento River